Bhairaram Chaudhary is an Indian politician from the Bharatiya Janata Party and a former member of the Rajasthan Legislative Assembly. He represented the Osian Vidhan Sabha constituency of Rajasthan.

Early life 
Bhairaram Chaudhary was born on 16 June 1971 to a family of farmers in a small village Mandiyai Khurd, Jodhpur. He is the youngest among three boys born to Bhagwanaram Chaudhary and Bagtu Devi. His family belongs to Jat community.

Education 
Bhaira Ram completed B.A. Hons (History) (1991) from Jainarayan Vyas University Jodhpur.

References 

Bharatiya Janata Party politicians from Rajasthan